ISO 3166-2:UA is the entry for Ukraine in ISO 3166-2, part of the ISO 3166 standard published by the International Organization for Standardization (ISO), which defines codes for the names of the principal subdivisions (e.g., provinces or states) of all countries coded in ISO 3166-1.

Currently for Ukraine, ISO 3166-2 codes are defined for 24 regions, 1 republic, and 2 cities, including codes for the Autonomous Republic of Crimea and Sevastopol which continue to be internationally recognized as part of Ukraine though have been de facto administered by the Russian Federation since 2014. The two cities have special status equal to the regions.

Each code consists of two parts, separated by a hyphen. The second part is two digits, which is taken from the local standard KOATUU, with the following exceptions:
Chernivtsi Oblast uses 77 (its KOATUU code is 73)
Luhansk Oblast uses 09 (its KOATUU code is 44)
The Autonomous Republic of Crimea uses 43 (its KOATUU code is 01)
The city Kyiv uses 30 (its KOATUU code is 80)
The city Sevastopol uses 40 (its KOATUU code is 85)

Current codes

Subdivision names are listed as in the ISO 3166-2 standard published by the ISO 3166 Maintenance Agency (ISO 3166/MA).

Click on the button in the header to sort each column.

See also

 Geography of Ukraine
 FIPS region codes of Ukraine
 List of places named after people (Ukraine)
 Subdivisions of Ukraine

External links
 ISO Online Browsing Platform: UA
 Regions of Ukraine, Statoids.com

2:UA

Ukraine geography-related lists